Alicia Molik was the defending champion, but was unable to compete due to vestibular neuronitis.

Justine Henin-Hardenne won the title, defeating Francesca Schiavone 4–6, 7–5, 7–5 in the final.

Singles results

Seeds
 The top four seeds receive a bye into the second round

Finals

Top half

Bottom half

References

External links
 ITF tournament details

2006 WTA Tour
Women's Singles